Lothario is a male given name that came to suggest an unscrupulous seducer of women, based upon a character in The Fair Penitent, a 1703 tragedy by Nicholas Rowe. In Rowe's play, Lothario is a libertine who seduces and betrays Calista; and his success is the source for the proverbial nature of the name in the subsequent English culture. It was first mentioned in this sense in 1756 in The World, the 18th century London weekly newspaper, No. 202 ("The gay [meaning joyful, merry] Lothario dresses for the fight"). Samuel Richardson used “haughty, gallant, gay Lothario” as the model for the self-indulgent Robert Lovelace in his novel Clarissa (1748), and Calista suggested the character of Clarissa Harlowe. Edward Bulwer-Lytton used the name allusively in his 1849 novel The Caxtons ("And no woman could have been more flattered and courted by Lotharios and lady-killers than Lady Castleton has been."). Anthony Trollope in Barchester Towers (1857) wrote of "the elegant fluency of a practised Lothario".

The Fair Penitent itself is an adaptation of The Fatal Dowry (1632), a play by Philip Massinger and Nathan Field. The name Lothario was previously used for a somewhat similar character in The Cruel Brother (1630) by William Davenant. A character with the same name also appears in The Ill-Advised Curiosity, a story within a story in Miguel de Cervantes' 1605 novel, Don Quixote, Part One, but Lothario there is most unwilling to seduce his friend's wife and does so only being urged by the former, who recklessly wants to test her fidelity.

Because of the allusive use the name sometimes is not capitalized.

See also

 Giacomo Casanova
 Don Juan
 Russell Brand
 Lord Byron
 George Best
 Lotario (name)

Notes

Sources
The World, No. 157-209. The British Essayists in Forty-Five Volumes. Vol. XXIX. London: 1823. Includes a reprint of the No. 202 issue of The World, November 11, 1756.

Male characters in literature
Male characters in theatre
Characters in plays
Pejorative terms for men
Seduction